Murli is a village in West Champaran district in the Indian state of Bihar.

Demographics
As of 2011 India census, Murli had a population of 875 in 184 households. Males constitute 51.2% of the population and females 48.7%. Murli has an average literacy rate of 53.9%, lower than the national average of 74%: male literacy is 55%, and female literacy is 44%. In Murli, 18.8% of the population is under 6 years of age.

References

Villages in West Champaran district